Izola City Stadium is a multi-use stadium in Izola, Slovenia. It is currently used mostly for football matches and is the home ground of MNK Izola. The stadium has a capacity of 5,085 seats.

Concerts
Iggy Pop (1994)
Deep Purple (1996)
Nek (1998)
Iron Maiden (2000)
Deep Purple (2004)
Status Quo (2004)
Cheap Trick (2004)

Gallery

See also
List of football stadiums in Slovenia

References

External links
Mestni stadion Izola Mestni stadion Izola on Football Stadiums of Slovenia

Football venues in Slovenia
Multi-purpose stadiums in Slovenia
Sports venues completed in 1964
Sports venues in the Slovene Littoral
20th-century architecture in Slovenia